Jürgen Echternach (born 1 November 1937 in Lauenburg (now Lębork, Poland) – 4 April 2006 in Hamburg) was a German politician, representative of the Christian Democratic Union (CDU).

From 1987 to 1993 he was Parliamentary Secretary of State for Planning, Building and Urban Development and from 1993 to 1994 he worked in the Federal Ministry of Finance. Echternach was a member of the Bundestag from 1980 to 1994, representing Hamburg-Altona from 1987 to 1990.

See also 
List of German Christian Democratic Union politicians

External links 
 Obituary in Welt online

1937 births
2006 deaths
People from Lębork
People from the Province of Pomerania
Christian Democratic Union of Germany politicians